A toy soldier is a miniature figurine that represents a soldier. The term applies to depictions of uniformed military personnel from all eras, and includes knights, cowboys, American Indians, pirates, samurai, and other subjects that involve combat-related themes. Toy soldiers vary from simple playthings to highly realistic and detailed models. The latter are of more recent development and are sometimes called model figures to distinguish them from traditional toy soldiers. Larger scale toys such as dolls and action figures may come in military uniforms, but they are not generally considered toy soldiers.

Toy soldiers are made from all types of material, but the most common mass-produced varieties are metal and plastic. There are many different kinds of toy soldiers, including tin soldiers or flats, hollow-cast metal figures, composition figures, and plastic army men. Metal toy soldiers were traditionally sold in sets; plastic figures were sold in toy shops individually in Britain and Europe and in large boxed sets in the U.S. Modern, collectable figures are often sold individually.

Scale

Scale for toy soldiers is expressed as the soldier's approximate height from head to foot in millimeters. Because many figures do not stand up straight, height is usually an approximation. Standard toy soldier scale, originally adopted by W. Britain, is 54 mm (2.25 inches) or 1:32 scale. Among different manufacturers, standard scale may range from 50 mm or 1:35 scale, to 60 mm or 1:28 scale. For gamers and miniatures enthusiasts, 25 mm and even smaller scales are available. On the larger end of the scale are American dimestore figures, and many of the toy soldiers produced in Germany, which are approximately 75 mm (3 inches) or 1:24 scale.

History

Military figures have been found in ancient Egyptian tombs, and have appeared in many cultures and eras. Tin soldiers were produced in Germany as early as the 1730s, by molding the metal between two pieces of slate. Toy soldiers became widespread during the 18th century, inspired by the military exploits of Frederick the Great. Miniature soldiers were also used in the 17th, 18th, and 19th centuries by military strategists to plan battle tactics by using the figures to show the locations of real soldiers. In 1893, the British toy company William Britain revolutionized the production of toy soldiers by devising the method of hollow casting, making soldiers that were cheaper and lighter than their German counterparts.

In addition to Britains, there have been many other manufacturers of toy soldiers over the years. For example, John Hill & Company produced hollow cast lead figures in the same style and scale. Companies such as Elastolin and Lineol were well known for their composite figures made of glue and sawdust that included both military and civilian subjects. After 1950, rising production costs and the development of plastic meant that many shop keepers liked the lighter, cheaper, and far less prone to break in transit polythene figure. This led to greater numbers of plastic toy soldiers. The first American plastic soldiers were made by Beton as early as 1937. The first plastic toy soldiers produced in Great Britain were made in 1946 by Airfix before they became known for their famous model kits range.

One large historical producer in plastic was Louis Marx and Company, which produced both realistic soldiers of great detail and also historical collections of plastic men and women, including the "Presidents of the United States" collection, "Warriors of the World", "Generals of World War II", "Jesus and the Apostles", and figures from the Coronation of Queen Elizabeth II. Marx also produced boxed playsets that featured many famous battles with armies of two sides, character figures, and terrain features. Britains produced plastic figures under the brand names of Herald and Deetail. Also in England, the scale model company, Airfix produced a variety of high quality plastic sets, which were frequently painted by hobbyists. Many Airfix figures were imitated by other companies and reproduced as inexpensive, bagged plastic army men.
Timpo Toys, Britains main competitor in terms of sales and quality in the 1960s and 70s developed the 'Over - Moulding' system. Different coloured plastics were injected into the mould at various stages, creating a fully coloured figure without the need of paint.

During the 1990s, the production of metal toy-grade painted figures and connoisseur-grade painted toy soldiers increased to serve the demands of the collectors' market. The style of many of these figures shifted from the traditional gloss-coat enamel paint to the matte-finished acrylic paint, which allows for greater detail and historical accuracy. The change was largely inspired by the introduction of very high quality painted figures from St. Petersburg, Russia.

Collecting
There is a substantial hobby devoted to collecting both old and new toy soldiers, with an abundance of small manufacturers, dealers, and toy soldier shows. There are even specialty magazines devoted to the hobby, such as "Toy Soldier Collector", "Plastic Warrior" and "Toy Soldier and Model Figure". Collectors often specialize in a particular type of soldier or historical period, though some people enjoy collecting many different kinds of figures. The most popular historical periods for collecting are Napoleonic, Victorian, American Civil War, World War I, and World War II. Many collectors modify and paint plastic figures, and some even cast and paint their own metal figures.

Actor Douglas Fairbanks Jr had a collection of 3000 toy soldiers when he sold it in 1977.  Fantasy novelist George R. R. Martin has a substantial collection of toy knights and castles. The most extensive collection of toy soldiers was probably that of Malcolm Forbes, who began collecting toy soldiers in the late 1960s and amassed a collection of over 90,000 figures by the time of his death in 1990. Anne Seddon Kinsolving Brown of Providence, Rhode Island, USA, began collecting miniature toy soldiers on her honeymoon to Europe in 1930, eventually amassing a collection of over 6,000 figures; these are on display at the Anne S. K. Brown Military Collection at Brown University Library in Providence.

Some of the more noteworthy, annual toy soldier and historical figure shows include the Plastic Warrior Show, which is the oldest established show in the UK. Beginning in 1985 and still being held annually in Richmond, South London. Another well known show is the London Toy Soldier Show held in central London (now owned and operated by the magazine Toy Soldier Collector), the Miniature Figure Collectors of America (MFCA) show in Valley Forge, the Chicago Toy Soldier Show (OTSN) in Illinois, the East Coast Toy Soldier Show in New Jersey, the West Coaster Toy Soldier Show in California, the Sammlerbörse (Collector's Market) in Friedberg, Germany and the biennial Zinnfigurenbörse (Tin Figure Market) in Kulmbach, Germany.

In recent years, collectors of vintage toy soldiers made of polythene PE and polypropylene PP thermoplastics as well as PC/ABS plastic blends have reported brittling and disintegration of collectible miniatures or components thereof.

Varieties

Different types and styles of toy soldiers have been produced over the years, depending on the cost and availability of materials, as well as manufacturing technologies. Here is a list of some of the most commonly collected varieties of toy soldiers.
Aluminum – slush-cast aluminium, made chiefly in France during the early and middle 20th Century
Army men – unpainted, soft plastic toy soldiers sold inexpensively in bags or with terrain pieces and vehicles in boxed playsets
Composition – made from a mixture of sawdust and glue, manufactured mostly in Europe, Austria and Germany. Made in the US during WWII metal rationing.
Connoisseur – high quality, collectible figures featuring highly detailed paint jobs
Dimestore – hollow- or slush-cast iron, sold through five and dime stores from the 1920s to 1960 in the United States
Flat – thin, two dimensional tin soldiers cast in slate molds
Hollow cast – cast in metal, usually a lead alloy, which cools and sets as it touches the mold; the excess molten metal is poured out leaving a hollow figure
Paper – printed on sheets of paper or cardboard, frequently mounted on blocks of wood
Plastic – hard and soft plastic, generally painted figures
Solid – cast in solid metal, usually lead, common in Germany during the 19th and early 20th Century
Wood - From the 19th century Germany produced large amounts of wooden fortresses and toy soldiers sometimes working on a scissors mechanism .

Prominent vintage toy soldier makers include Airfix, Barclay, Britains, Herald, Elastolin, Johillco, Lineol, Marx, Manoil, Reamsa and Timpo.

Gaming

The playing of wargames with toy figures was pioneered by H. G. Wells in his 1913 book, Little Wars. Wells, a pacifist, was the first to publish detailed rules for playing war games with toy soldiers. He suggested that this could provide a cathartic experience, possibly preventing future real wars. Although this was not to be, Little Wars was a predecessor to the modern hobby of miniatures wargaming. According to Wells, the idea of the game developed from a visit by his friend Jerome K. Jerome.  After dinner, Jerome began shooting down toy soldiers with a toy cannon and Wells joined in to compete.

A similar book titled Shambattle: How to Play with Toy Soldiers was published by Harry Dowdall and Joseph Gleason in 1929.

Although people continue to play wargames with miniature figures, most contemporary wargamers use a smaller scale than that favored by collectors, typically under 25 mm.

See also
Army men
Britains (toy brand)
Britains Deetail
Miniature wargaming
Model figure
Reamsa, a defunct Spanish plastic toy brand
Tin soldier
The Parade of the Tin Soldiers

References

External links

Antiques View - New York Times article
Anne S. K. Brown Military Collection, Brown University Library - collection of over 6,000 miniature toy soldiers
Chicago Toy Soldier Show - largest annual show in the United States
Military Miniature Society of Illinois
World Model Expo 2017 (Chicago)

Scale modeling
Militaria
Toy figurines
Toy collecting
Traditional toys
Metal toys